Osage Township is a township in Morgan County, in the U.S. state of Missouri.

Osage Township, like the Osage River, derives its name from the Osage Nation.

References

Townships in Missouri
Townships in Morgan County, Missouri